Sir Herbert Lightfoot Eason   (15 July 1874 – 2 November 1949)) was an ophthalmic surgeon and Superintendent at Guy's Hospital, London, President of the General Medical Council, Vice Chancellor from 1935–1937 (and later Principal) of the University of London. He was knighted in 1943.

Early life
He was educated at University College, London and Guy's Hospital, London.

War service
During the First World War he was lieutenant colonel in the RAMC and Consulting Ophthalmic Surgeon to Forces in the Mediterranean and Egypt from 1915–19.

Personal life
He married first in 1908, Ierne Bingham (d 1917), the eldest daughter of 5th Baron Clanmorris and they had a daughter. He married, second, 1920, Margaret Wallace, of Quidenham, Attleborough, Norfolk and they had two daughters.

See also
 List of Vice-Chancellors of the University of London
 List of British university chancellors and vice-chancellors

References

1874 births
1949 deaths
Alumni of the UCL Medical School
British ophthalmologists
Vice-Chancellors of the University of London
Royal Army Medical Corps officers
Companions of the Order of St Michael and St George
Companions of the Order of the Bath
Knights Bachelor
Chairs of the General Medical Council